The highway starting from its junction with NH-70 near Tanot connecting Ramgarh, Bhadasar, Jaisalmer, Barmer, Sanchor in the State of Rajasthan, Tharad, Bhabar, Radhanpur, Kamalpur, Khakhal, Roda, Dunawada, Patan, Chanasma, Mahesana, Kherva, Gojariya, Sama, Churada, Kuvadara and terminating at its junction with NH-48 near Prantij in the State of Gujarat.

References

External links
 NH 68 on OpenStreetMap

National highways in India